The following is a list of notable deaths in January 1994.

Entries for each day are listed alphabetically by surname. A typical entry lists information in the following sequence:
 Name, age, country of citizenship at birth, subsequent country of citizenship (if applicable), reason for notability, cause of death (if known), and reference.

January 1994

1
William Chappell, 86, British dancer, ballet designer and director.
Raymond Crotty, 68, Irish economist, writer, and academic.
Walter Eckhardt, 87, German politician.
Arthur Porritt, Baron Porritt, 93, New Zealand physician, statesman and athlete.
Cesar Romero, 86, American actor (Batman, Ocean's 11, The Thin Man) and activist.
E. A. Thompson, 79, Irish-British marxist historian.

2
Viktor Aristov, 50, Soviet and Russian film director and screenwriter.
Miguel M. Delgado, 88, Mexican film director and screenwriter, cancer.
Lys Gauty, 93, French cabaret singer and actress.
Dixy Lee Ray, 79, American politician.
Vitālijs Rubenis, 79, Latvian communist politician.
William Ryan, 72, Irish Fianna Fáil politician.
Pierre-Paul Schweitzer, 81, French businessman.
Eddie Smith, 80, American Major League Baseball player.

3
Katharine Elliot, Baroness Elliot of Harwood, 90, British public servant and politician.
Norman Hepple, 85, English painter, engraver and sculptor, traffic accident.
Frank Belknap Long, 92, American writer  and poet.
Marion Ross, 90, Scottish physicist.
Heather Sears, 58, British actress, multiple organ failure.

4
Rahul Dev Burman, 54, Indian music director, cardiovascular disease.
Reijer Hooykaas, 87, Dutch historian of science.
Eileen Mayo, 87, English-Australian artist and designer.
Thirukkuralar V. Munusamy, 80, Indian scholar and politician.
Constantin Vișoianu, 96, Romanian jurist, diplomat, and politician.

5
Aldo Baldin, 49, Brazilian opera tenor.
David Bates, 77, Northern Irish mathematician and physicist.
Jeanne Carpenter, 76, American child actress of the silent era, pulmonary emphysema.
Brian Johnston, 81, British cricket commentator, author, and television presenter, heart attack.
Eliška Junková, 93, Czechoslovak automobile racer.
Franz Murer, 81, Austrian SS officer and war criminal.
Tip O'Neill, 81, American politician, colorectal cancer.
Peggy Simpson, 80, British actress.

6
Fidel Castaño, 43, Colombian drug lord and paramilitary.
Oscar Fraley, 79, American sports writer and author.
Cláudia Magno, 35, Brazilian actress and dancer, AIDS-related complications.
Per Palle Storm, 83, Danish-Norwegian sculptor and arts professor.
Adri van Es, 80, Royal Netherlands Navy vice admiral.
Keith Wells, 31, American convicted murderer, execution by lethal injection.

7
Arthur Dooley, 64, English artist and sculptor.
Charlie McNeil, 57, American gridiron football player.
Vittorio Mezzogiorno, 52, Italian actor, cancer.
Llewellyn Rees, 92, English actor.
Phoumi Vongvichit, 84, President of Laos.

8
Pat Buttram, 78, American actor (Green Acres, Robin Hood, The Fox and the Hound), kidney failure.
René Faye, 70, French cyclist.
Harvey Haddix, 68, American baseball pitcher and pitching coach, pulmonary emphysema.
Harry Boye Karlsen, 73, Norwegian football player.
Roy Kiyooka, 67, Canadian painter, poet, photographer, and multi-media artist.
Ruth Osburn, 81, American athlete and Olympian.
Chandrashekarendra Saraswati, 99, Indian Hindu religious leader.

9
Faruk Barlas, 78, Turkish football player.
Kayhan Kaynak, 33, Turkish football player, heart attack.
Madge Ryan, 75, Australian actress.
Johnny Temple, 66, American Major League Baseball player, pancreatic cancer.
Joachim Werner, 84, German archaeologist.

10
Michael Aldridge, 73, English actor (Last of the Summer Wine).
Sven-Erik Bäck, 74, Swedish composer of classical music.
Ien Dales, 62, Dutch socialist politician and social worker, heart attack.
Chub Feeney, 72, American baseball executive, heart attack.
Yigal Hurvitz, 75, Israeli politician.
Girija Kumar Mathur, 75, Indian Hindi  writer.
Bruno Storti, 80, Italian trade unionist and politician.
Clem Stralka, 80, American gridiron football player.
Roman Tkachuk, 61, Soviet theatre and film actor.

11
József Háda, 82, Hungarian football player.
Chester L. Mize, 76, American politician.
Helmut Poppendick, 92, German physician and SS officer during World War II.
Ram Ramirez, 80, Puerto Rican born jazz pianist and composer.
Édouard Rinfret, 88, Canadian politician.
Emilio Rosenblueth, 67, Mexican engineer.
Robert Winslow, 77, American gridiron football player and coach.

12
Samuel Bronston, 85, American film producer, film director, and nephew of communist revolutionary Leon Trotsky, pneumonia.
Goran Ivandić, 38, Yugoslav drummer, suicide.
Greg Kabat, 82, American and Canadian football player.
Gustav Naan, 74, Estonian philosopher and physicist.
Nehemiah Tamari, 47, Israeli general, helicopter crash.
Arthur Turner, 84, English football player and manager.
John West Wells, 86, American paleontologist, cnidariologist, and geologist.

13
Hervé Alphand, 86, French diplomat, and French ambassador to the United States.
Erhard Bauer, 68, German football player.
Johan Jørgen Holst, 56, Norwegian politician.
Norm Jacobson, 76, Australian rugby player and coach.

14
Ahmad Ali, 84, Pakistani novelist, poet, diplomat and scholar.
Chesley William Carter, 91, Canadian politician.
Jack Faber, 91, American sports coach and microbiologist.
Myron Fohr, 81, American racecar driver.
Ivan Fuqua, 84, America track and field athlete.
Fritz Losigkeit, 80, German flying ace during World War II.
Federica Montseny, 88, Spanish politician, anarchist, intellectual and writer.
Esther Ralston, 91, American silent film actress, heart attack.
Delio Rodríguez, 77, Spanish racing cyclist.
Nubar Terziyan, 84, Turkish actor.

15
Philippe Brun, 85, French trumpeter.
György Cziffra, 72, Hungarian-French pianist and composer, lung cancer.
Gabriel-Marie Garrone, 92, French Catholic cardinal.
Ben H. Guill, 84, American politician.
Martin Kosleck, 89, German actor.
Agnar Mykle, 78, Norwegian writer and puppeteer.
Harry Nilsson, 52, American singer-songwriter ("Everybody's Talkin'"), heart failure.
Harilal Upadhyay, 77, Indian novelist and poet.

16
Sidon Ebeling, 93, Swedish long-distance runner and Olympian.
Jack Metcalfe, 81, Australian long jumper, triple jumper and javelin thrower.
Leland Stowe, 94, American journalist and winner of the Pulitzer Prize.
Pál Szalai, 78, Hungarian police officer who save hundreds of Jews from the Holocaust during World War II.

17
T. T. Fields, 81, American politician.
Chung Il-kwon, 76, South Korean general and politician, lymphoma.
Yevgeny Ivanov, 68, Soviet spy.
Juan Carlos Pugliese, 78, Argentinian lawyer and politician.
Helen Stephens, 75, American athlete and Olympic champion.
Robin Turton, Baron Tranmire, 90, British politician.

18
Arthur Altman, 83, American songwriter.
Silvio Bergamini, 70, Italian rower and Olympian.
Lee Roy Caffey, 52, American gridiron football player, cancer.
Frank M. Carpenter, 91, American entomologist and paleontologist, heart attack
Rosemary Glyde, 45, American musician, cancer.
Rolf Singer, 87, German mycologist.

19
Eugene Kamenka, 65, Australian political philosopher and scholar.
Haik Hovsepian Mehr, 49, Iranian-Armenian Protestant minister, murdered.
Kenneth Utt, 72, American film producer (The Silence of the Lambs), Oscar winner (1992), bone cancer.
Joseph Vliers, 61, Belgian football player.

20
Matt Busby, 84, Scottish football player and manager, cancer.
Ľubor Kresák, 66, Slovak astronomer.
Bedia Muvahhit, 97, Turkish actress.
Jaramogi Oginga Odinga, 82, Kenyan chieftain and politician.
Darío Segovia, 61, Paraguayan football player.

21
Bassel al-Assad, 31, Syrian colonel, politician and son of president Hafez al-Assad, traffic collision.
Giorgio Prosperi, 86, Italian screenwriter.
Timo Suviranta, 63, Finnish basketball player.
Tony Waddington, 69, English football manager
Bill Young, 79, American gridiron football player and coach.

22
Vincent Allard, 72, Belgian entomologist.
Jean-Louis Barrault, 83, French actor, director and mime artist, heart attack.
Graziano Battistini, 57, Italian road bicycle racer.
Rhett Forrester, 37, American rock singer and musician (Riot), shot during carjacking.
Frances Gifford, 73, American actress, pulmonary emphysema.
Telly Savalas, 72, American actor (Kojak, On Her Majesty's Secret Service, Birdman of Alcatraz) and singer, Emmy winner (1974), cancer.

23
Adolph Baller, 84, Austrian-American pianist, kidney failure.
Lee Alvin DuBridge, 92, American educator and physicist, pneumonia.
Klaus Hemmerle, 64, German Roman Catholic bishop, cancer.
Alexei Mozhaev, 75, Soviet and Russian painter, graphic artist, and art teacher.
Yngve Nordwall, 85, Swedish film actor and director.
Nikolai Ogarkov, 76, Soviet military officer and Hero of the Soviet Union.
Eila Pennanen, 77, Finnish writer, critic, and essayist.
Brian Redhead, 64, British author, journalist and broadcaster.
Oliver Smith, 75, American scenic designer and interior designer, pulmonary emphysema.

24
Sidney Quinn Curtiss, 76, American politician.
Raymond F. Jones, 78, American science fiction author.
Yves Navarre, 53, French writer, suicide.
Helge Vatsend, 65, Norwegian poet and novelist.

25
James Boyce, 46, British politician, heart attack.
Pat Crawford, 91, American Major League Baseball player.
Aida McAnn Flemming, 97, Canadian teacher, writer and animal rights advocate.
Stephen Cole Kleene, 85, American mathematician.
James Zachery, 35, American gridiron football player, murdered.

26
Ales Adamovich, 66, Soviet and Belarusian writer, critic, and academic, heart attack.
Elsa Andersson, 99, Swedish diver and Olympian.
Lejaren Hiller, 69, American composer, Alzheimer's disease.
Ivan Warner, 74, American lawyer and politician, cancer.

27
Stanley Adams, 86, American lyricist and songwriter, cancer.
Claude Akins, 67, American actor (B. J. and the Bear, Inherit the Wind, The Caine Mutiny), cancer.
Eddie Calhoun, 72, American jazz double bassist.
Alain Daniélou, 86, French historian, musicologist, and indologist.
Sherm Feller, 75, American musical composer and radio personality.
Hans H. Gattermann, 62, German politician and member of the Bundestag.
Sergei Scherbakov, 75, Russian welterweight boxer.
Frank Twiss, 83, British Royal Navy admiral.
Boris Vorontsov-Velyaminov, 89, Russian astrophysicist.

28
Afif al-Bizri, 80, Syrian military officer.
Emily Taft Douglas, 94, American politician.
Betty Go-Belmonte, 60, Filipina journalist and newspaper publisher.
Frank Hardy, 76, Australian novelist and writer, heart attack.
William Levitt, 86, American real-estate developer regarded as the father of modern American suburbia.
George Rosso, 64, American gridiron football player.
Hal Smith, 77, American actor (The Andy Griffith Show, The Many Adventures of Winnie the Pooh, Beauty and the Beast), heart attack.

29
Marguerite Allan, 88, Russian-born British actress.
Nick Cravat, 82, American actor and stunt performer, cancer, lung cancer.
Yevgeny Leonov, 67, Soviet and Russian actor, pulmonary embolism.
Ulrike Maier, 26, Austrian alpine ski racer, World Champion and Olympian, skiing accident.
Tollien Schuurman, 81, Dutch sprinter and Olympian.
Jakobína Sigurðardóttir, 75, Icelandic writer.
Jakob Vaage, 88, Norwegian educator, author and historian.

30
Pierre Boulle, 81, French novelist.
Claude Nigon, 65, French fencer and Olympian.
Oswald Phipps, 4th Marquess of Normanby, 81, British peer and philanthropist.
Laura Nucci, 80, Italian film actress.
Jan Schaefer, 53, Dutch politician and community organiser, diabetes.
Rudolf Schwarz, 88, Austrian-American conductor.
Bahjat Talhouni, 81, Jordanian politician.
Don Turnbull, 84, Australian tennis player.

31
Master Abdullah, 64, Pakistani film music composer.
Alberto Sorrentino, 77, Italian film actor.
Erwin Strittmatter, 81, German writer.
Tomanija Đuričko, 79, Serbian actress.

References 

1994-01
 01